John Harris (c. 1666 – 7 September 1719) was an English writer, scientist, and Anglican priest. He is best known as the editor of the Lexicon Technicum: Or, A Universal English Dictionary of Arts and Sciences (1704), the earliest of English encyclopaedias; as the compiler of the Collection Collection of voyages and travels, published under his name; and as the author of an unfinished county history of Kent.

Life

Harris was born about 1666, probably in Shropshire, and was a scholar of Trinity College, Oxford, from 1684 to 1688. He was presented to the vicarage of Icklesham in Sussex, and subsequently to the rectory of St Thomas, Winchelsea. In 1696 he was elected a Fellow of the Royal Society and published a paper in the Society's Philosophical Transactions on microscope observations of animalcula which included the very first description of a bdelloid rotifer.

In 1698 he gave the seventh series of the Boyle Lectures, Atheistical Objections against the Being of God and His Attributes fairly considered and fully refuted.

Between 1702 and 1704 he delivered at the Marine Coffee House in Birchin Lane, London, the mathematical lectures founded by Sir Charles Cox, and advertised himself as a mathematical tutor at Amen Corner. The friendship of Sir William Cowper secured for him the office of private chaplain, a prebend in Rochester Cathedral (1708), and the rectory of the united London parishes of St Mildred, Bread Street and St Margaret Moses, as well as other preferments.

In politics he showed himself a Whig, and engaged in a bitter quarrel with the Rev. Charles Humphreys, who afterwards was chaplain to the High-Church Tory Henry Sacheverell.

Harris for a time acted as vice-president of the Royal Society. At his death, he was completing an elaborate History of Kent in Five Parts of which the first volume only was published, by D. Midwinter of St. Paul's Churchyard, London, in 1719.  He is said to have died in poverty brought on by his own bad management of his affairs.

Works

References

External links

Dictionary of Scientific Biography
Harris's 1697 book, Remarks on some late papers relating to the universal deluge : and to the natural history of the earth, in the digital collection of the Linda Hall Library
Description of Remarks... (1697) from a catalog of a 1984 exhibition about Theories of the Earth 1644-1830 at the Linda Hall Library (see bottom of page)
 
 

1666 births
1719 deaths
English book editors
Fellows of the Royal Society
Alumni of Trinity College, Oxford
English male non-fiction writers
People from Winchelsea
People from Icklesham
17th-century Anglican theologians
18th-century Anglican theologians